The Veleti, also known as Wilzi, Wielzians, and Wiltzes, were a group of medieval Lechitic tribes within the territory of Hither Pomerania, related to Polabian Slavs. They had formed together the Confederation of the Veleti, a loose monarchic confederation of the tribes. Said state existed between the 6th and 10th centuries, after which, it was succeeded by the Lutician Federation.

Name 
The name Veleti stems from the root vel- ('high, tall'). The Veleti were called by other names, probably given by their neighbours, such as Lutices, Ljutici, or Volki, Volčki. The latter means 'wolf', and the former probably 'fierce creature' based upon the comparison with the belarusian definition lyutyj zvěr. In common with other Slavic groups between the Elbe and Oder Rivers, they were often described by Germanic sources as Wends. In the late 10th century, they were continued by the Lutici. In Einhard's Vita Karoli Magni, the Wilzi are said to refer to themselves as Welatabians.

Veleti tribes

The first mention of a tribe named Veltae is found in Ptolemy's second-century Geography, Book III, chapter V: "Back from the Ocean, near the Venedicus Bay [Baltic Sea], the Veltae dwell, above whom are the Ossi." The Bavarian Geographer's anonymous medieval document compiled in Regensburg in 830 contains a list of the tribes in Central Europe east of the Elbe. Among other tribes it also lists the Uuilci (Veleti), featuring 95 civitates.

The Veleti did not remain a unified tribe for long: local tribes developed, the most important being: the Kissini (Kessiner, Chizzinen, Kyzziner) along the lower Warnow and Rostock, named after their capital Kessin; the Circipani (Zirzipanen) along the Trebel and Peene Rivers, with their capital believed to be Teterow and strongholds in Demmin and probably even Güstrow; the Tollenser east and south of the Peene along the Tollense River; and the Redarier south and east of the Tollensesee on the upper Havel. The Hevelli living in the Havel area and, though more unlikely, the Rujanes of Rugia might once have been part of the Veletians. Even the Leitha region of Lower Austria may have been named for a tribe of Veleti, the Leithi.

This political splitting of the Veleti probably occurred due to the size of the inhabited area, with settlements grouped around rivers and forts and separated by large strips of woodlands. Also, the Veletian king Dragowit had been defeated and made a vassal by Charlemagne in the only expedition into Slavic territory led by Charlemagne himself, in 798, causing the central Veletian rule to collapse. The Veleti were invaded by the Franks during their continuous expeditions into Obodrite lands, with the Obodrites being allies of the Franks against the Saxons. Einhard made these claims in "Vita Karoli Magni" (Life of Charles the Great), a biography of Charlemagne, King of the Franks.

After the 10th century, the Veleti disappeared from written records, and were replaced by the Lutici who at least in part continued the Veleti tradition.

See also
Pomerania during the Early Middle Ages
List of Medieval Slavic tribes

Notes

References

Bibliography

External links
 Dragowit, Fürst der Wilzen 

Polabian Slavs
Lechites
West Slavic tribes
Former monarchies of Europe
Former countries in Europe
Former principalities
Former confederations
States and territories established in the 6th century
States and territories disestablished in the 10th century